Recurrence and recurrent may refer to:
Disease recurrence, also called relapse
Eternal recurrence, or eternal return, the concept that the universe has been recurring, and will continue to recur, in a self-similar form an infinite number of times across infinite time or space
Historic recurrence, the repetition of similar events in history
Poincaré recurrence theorem, Henri Poincaré's theorem on dynamical systems
Radial recurrent artery – arising from the radial artery immediately below the elbow
Recursive definition
Recurrent neural network, a special artificial neural network
Recurrence period density entropy, an information-theoretic method for summarising the recurrence properties of dynamical systems
Recurrence plot, a statistical plot that shows a pattern that re-occurs
Recurrence relation, an equation which defines a sequence recursively
Recurrent rotation, a term used in contemporary hit radio for frequently aired songs
Recurrence The Railway Children (band) album

See also 
Recursion
Mathematical induction
Feedback (disambiguation)